There are at least 28 named mountains in Pondera County, Montana.
 Black Buttes, el. 
 Bruin Peaks, el. 
 Bullshoe Mountain, el. 
 Conrad Butte, el. 
 Curly Bear Mountain, el. 
 Elbow Mountain, el. 
 Elkcalf Mountain, el. 
 Family Peak, el. 
 Feather Woman Mountain, el. 
 Flag Butte, el. 
 Flattop Mountain, el. 
 Goat Mountain, el. 
 Half Dome Crag, el. 
 Heart Butte, el. 
 Kiyo Crag, el. 
 Little Plume Peak, el. 
 Lookout Butte, el. 
 Morningstar Mountain, el. 
 Mount Poia, el. 
 Mount Richmond, el. 
 Running Crane Mountain, el. 
 Running Owl Mountain, el. 
 Sam George Hill, el. 
 Scarface Mountain, el. 
 Scoffin Butte, el. 
 Split Mountain, el. 
 Spotted Eagle Mountain, el. 
 Telephone Hill, el.

See also
 List of mountains in Montana
 List of mountain ranges in Montana

Notes

Landforms of Pondera County, Montana
Pondera